Present the Paisley Reich is the second album by lo-fi indie rock group Times New Viking. The CD release is expanded to include songs from two seven-inch releases: "Busy Making Love & War" and a split EP with Psychedelic Horseshit. The album was released on Siltbreeze Records.

Vinyl Track Listing
"Imagine Dead John Lennon"
"Devo & Wine"
"Little Amps"
"New Times, New Hope"
"Slay Atlantis"
"Teenage Lust!"
"Ladders"
"Love Your Daughters"
"Allegory Gets Me Hot"

CD Track Listing
"Imagine Dead John Lennon"
"Devo & Wine"
"Little Amps"
"New Times, New Hope"
"Slay Atlantis"
"Teenage Lust!"
"Ladders"
"Love Your Daughters"
"Allegory Gets Me Hot"
"+++"
"Bad Looks"
"Common Cold"
"Lover's Lane"
"Let Your Hair Grow Long"
"Hiding in Machines"

References

2007 albums
Times New Viking albums